Newington Gardens is located on Harper Road in Southwark, London, England. To the north-west is the Inner London Sessions House, a Crown Court. The park occupies part of the site of an old prison that was closed in 1878. The park was opened by Catherine Gladstone, wife of the then prime minister, on 5 May 1884.

The park occupies the site where Horsemonger Lane Gaol was located for almost a century from 1791. Designed by George Gwilt the Elder, architect surveyor to the county of Surrey, this was once the largest prison in the county.

The MUGA (Multi-Use Games Area) courts in the park are regularly used by the London Hardcourt Bicycle Polo Association for casual games and tournaments.

Newington Gardens is the burial place of Lieutenant Thomas Beauclerk, who committed suicide in Horsemonger's Gaol on 27 / 28 November 1832 and he was buried in the vicinity of Horsemonger's Gaol. He was committed to the prison to await trial on a charge of sodomy.

See also 
 Newington, London
 Newington Causeway

External links 
 Newington, Southwark – Hidden London
 LondonTown.com information
  London Gardens Online information

References

Parks and open spaces in the London Borough of Southwark